John Francis Hackett (December 7, 1911 – May 30, 1990) was an American prelate of the Roman Catholic Church. He served as an auxiliary bishop of the Archdiocese of Hartford from 1953 to 1986.

Biography
Hackett was born in New Haven, Connecticut, one of seven children of Thomas J. and Anne (Whalen) Hackett. He received his early education at public schools in New Haven, including Lovell School and Hillhouse High School. In 1929, he began his studies for the priesthood at St. Thomas Seminary in Bloomfield. In 1931, he was sent to continue his studies at Saint-Sulpice Seminary in Issy, France.

On June 29, 1936, Hackett was ordained a priest by Cardinal Jean Verdier at Notre Dame Cathedral in Paris. Following his return to Connecticut, he was assigned as a curate at St. Aloysius Church in New Canaan, where he remained for nine years. From 1945 to 1952, he served as secretary to Bishop Henry Joseph O'Brien and assistant chancellor of the Diocese of Hartford. He was named vice-chancellor in 1951 and chancellor in 1953.

On December 10, 1952, Hackett was appointed auxiliary bishop of Hartford and titular bishop of Helenopolis in Palaestina by Pope Pius XII. He received his episcopal consecration on March 19, 1953 from Bishop O'Brien, with Archbishop Francis Patrick Keough and Bishop Matthew Francis Brady serving as co-consecrators, at St. Joseph's Cathedral. He selected as his episcopal motto: Manete In Christo (Latin: "Remain in Christ"). The Diocese of Hartford was elevated to an archdiocese in August of that year. In 1959, he relinquished his duties as chancellor to become vicar general of the archdiocese.

Hackett served as a member of the boards of St. Francis Hospital, of St. Mary's Hospital in Waterbury, and of the Hospital of St. Raphael in New Haven. He was also president of the New England Conference of Catholic Hospitals and chairman of the New England Regional Conference of the National Conference of Catholic Bishops. He retired as auxiliary bishop of Hartford on December 7, 1986.

Hackett died from cancer at St. Francis Hospital in Hartford, at age 78.

References

External links
Roman Catholic Archdiocese of Hartford

1911 births
1990 deaths
Religious leaders from New Haven, Connecticut
St. Thomas Seminary alumni
Seminary of Saint-Sulpice (France) alumni
20th-century Roman Catholic bishops in the United States
Catholics from Connecticut